Sungai Lasi, known as Soengailasi when it was part of the Dutch East Indies, is a district in the Solok Regency of West Sumatra, Indonesia.

The area is known for its fruit including durian, mangosteen, rambutan, duku and Rambai in the hills of around the villages of Pianggu and Taruang-Taruang.

There is a popular weekly market, Lasi River Market (Pasar Sungai Lasi), on Wednesdays. The area is largely  agricultural with rice paddies and fields. There are also mineral deposits, especially iron ore. The Sungai Lasi and Batang Pamo rivers are in the hilly area. Flooding can be problematic. The area includes mixed dipterocarp lowland rainforest.

The district includes 9 villages:

Bukik Baih
Guguak Sarai
Indudua
Koto Laweh
Pianggu
Siaro-Aro
Sungai Durian
Sungai Jambua
Taruang-taruang

Gallery

See also
Kerinci Seblat National Park

References

Populated places in West Sumatra
Solok